Since its founding in 1843, the editorial stance of The Economist has been developed to further its founding purpose to "take part in a severe contest between intelligence, which presses forward, and an unworthy, timid ignorance obstructing our progress". First published by Scottish economist James Wilson to muster support for abolishing the British Corn Laws (1815–1846), a system of import tariffs, the weekly has made free trade a touchstone of their editorial stance. Its core stance has been summarized by The Guardian as a "trusted three-card trick of privatisation, deregulation and liberalisation".

In 2009, The Economist website featured this note about its editorial stance: "What, besides free trade and free markets, does The Economist believe in? 'It is to the Radicals that The Economist still likes to think of itself as belonging. The extreme centre is the paper's historical position.' That is as true today as when former Economist editor Geoffrey Crowther said it in 1955. The Economist considers itself the enemy of privilege, pomposity and predictability. It has backed conservatives such as Ronald Reagan and Margaret Thatcher. It has supported the Americans in Vietnam. But it has also endorsed Harold Wilson and Bill Clinton, and espoused a variety of liberal causes: opposing capital punishment from its earliest days, while favoring penal reform and decolonization, as well as—most recently—gun control and gay marriage."

Great Famine 
The newspaper opposed the provision of aid to the Irish during the Great Famine. The Economist argued for laissez-faire policies in which self-sufficiency, anti-protectionism and free trade, not food aid, were in the opinion of the paper the key to helping the Irish live through the famine which killed approximately one million people.

19th-century social reforms
In the 19th century the editorial stance of The Economist drifted away from supporting laissez-faire policies. In January 1883, for example, one editorial noted:

In September 1883, another editorial noted:

This change in editorial stance reflected a similar change in British politics itself, which had set aside the notion of laissez-faire as a practical philosophy some 50 years beforehand.

United Kingdom's entry into the Common Market
The editorial stance of The Economist on the UK's entry into the Common Market, like the stance of the New Statesman, gradually developed over time. Although it consistently took the position of a cooperative approach to Europe rather than an integrative approach, its initial opposition to European institutions gradually changed to acceptance over time. Once this change occurred, the weekly's supported a decentralized and cooperative model for European institutions, and democratic accountability.

In part, The Economists own editorial stance was a simple reflection of attitudes within the UK in general, and of its two major political parties through the middle to late 20th century (Conservative and Labour), resisting what it saw as surrender of sovereignty to a supranational institution for as long as possible, and attempting to preserve the UK's self-image of a world power.

Initially, in the years immediately after World War II, contributors to the paper dismissed and rejected proposals for European institutions such as the European Coal and Steel Community, the European Defence Community, the European Economic Community, and European Atomic Energy Community. Up to the late 1950s, the paper was pro-American.

However, in the period from 1957 to the 1980s, the paper's editorial opinion articles gradually came to accept the idea of the UK as a member in the various European communities. Medrano divides this period, and the transition of the newspaper's editorial stance, into three periods, which he labels "Denial", "Grudging Acceptance", and "Embrace". The New Statesman went through all three of these phases as well, although unlike The Economist, the New Statesman had not completed the third phase at the point of the UK's entry into the Common Market in the 1970s. The Economist had, and was supportive of UK membership during the initial negotiations for entry in the 1960s.

However, the newspaper, whilst supportive of entry, did not conceal its continued editorial dislike of European institutions and pro-American stance. It optimistically predicted that the UK's entry would be able to rectify what it saw as a drift away from the United States by Europe. This is exemplified by a July 1962 editorial:

The veto of the UK's entry, by Charles de Gaulle, in 1963 provoked an outraged response from The Economist, which in its editorials predicted the unravelling of European institutions. It also recommended an idea that it had supported in earlier years, that of an Atlantic Community, both economic and military.

Soon after the veto, The Economist'''s stance on the status of the UK as a dominant world power began to change. One milestone in this is an editorial published in May 1963:

In subsequent years, The Economist continued to support the idea of UK membership in the common market, and began to suggest that it was an economic necessity. It published weekly evaluations of the cost of both entry and of the European institutions, argued that membership of the EC was not incompatible with the Commonwealth of Nations, and discussed industrial and technological advantages that could be obtained as a result of membership. One change, however, was that it no longer pursued the idea of radically transforming the Community from within once the UK was a member, but rather suggested that the UK accept the Community as it already was.

Its reaction to de Gaulle's second veto of UK membership, in 1967, thus differed from its reaction in 1964. Rather than responding with anger and outrage as it had done before, its reaction was introspective and resigned. The paper no longer argued defiantly on the basis of the UK as a world power, but rather portrayed the UK as too small to stand alone, and thus encouraged resolve and perseverance with entry negotiations. This is exemplified by an October 1967 article:

The newspaper took to minimalizing the economic importance of the Commonwealth in its editorials, calling into question the interpretation of statistical data by those who had an emotional investment in the self-image of the UK as one-time head of an Empire:

It pointed to the Civil Service as one of the ways in which parliamentary sovereignty, something that the opponents of entry argued would be eroded by membership, had already been eroded. Whilst it no longer advocated radical transformation from within, it observed that the UK would have a significant voice within the Eureopean Community, by virtue of its size. Medrano equates the paper's change in editorial stance, immediately before and after the UK's final success in gaining membership, to a "religious conversion". It made economic arguments for membership, on the grounds of growing globalization of markets, political arguments based upon the idea of holding the government of West Germany (which was, at the time, the SPD with its then policy of Ostpolitik) in check, and emotional arguments that played on the British antipathy towards the French by presenting its own federalist view of European communities as an anti-French alternative to the French government's proposals of intergovernmental union.

Anglo-American relations
Whilst, as observed, The Economist editorial stance was pro-American when it came to postwar international alliances, it was not always so. One particular editorial, that was at the head of a nadir in Anglo-American relations in World War II, was "Noble Negatives". It was published in the 1944-12-30 edition of the newspaper, and is believed to be the work of Owen Fleming. The so-called "noble negatives" were two cornerstones of U.S. foreign policy: non-intervention with the object of non-involvement.

"Noble Negatives" appeared at the height of mutual criticisms between the UK and the U.S., and provoked wide discussion and comment in the news media of both. It was ostensibly a reply to the "outburst of criticism and abuse" that the U.S. had directed against the UK in previous weeks (that had been, in part, triggered by the Carlo Sforza affair). Its outspoken views on both U.S. foreign policy and sectors of U.S. public opinion were widely quoted, and in the view of Thomson, Meyer, and Briggs, writing in 1945, did much to "clear the air" between the two allies.

The editorial questioned whether the price that the UK had paid for collaboration with the U.S. during the war was not "too high for what we are likely to get". It characterized U.S. public opinion of the UK as "Britain is stealing a march on the poor repressed American exporter, Britain has no intention of fighting the Japanese, [and] Britain is not really fighting in Europe. Britain is imperialist, reactionary, selfish, exclusive, restrictive."

It reflected on this attitude by noting that "All is painfully familiar, the only novelty in the recent epidemic is the evidence that [the] American government itself—or at least part of it—is more anxious to provide ammunition for the miscontents than to correct their wild misstatements." The editorial called for a change in U.K. policy towards the U.S., saying, "Let an end be put to the policy of appeasement which, at Mr. Churchill's personal bidding, has been followed with all the humiliations and abasements", and concluded by saying that:

The result was a media sensation on both sides of the Atlantic. The Daily Telegraph had a headline article "British Frankness Has Good Effect in U.S." The Daily Herald headlined with "So the British Have Dared to Hit Back". Other headline articles were "Anglo-American Back Chat" (in the New York Herald Tribune) "Cross Talk" (in the Daily Mail), and "U.S. Comment on British Touchiness" (in the Manchester Guardian).

The Foreign Office agreed with the editorial, although secret reports from British security services in New York warned that in fact there was worse to come, with support for isolationism and nationalism growing in the U.S., a crumbling of pro-British factions, and an increase in anti-British views in official U.S. government circles. Both President Roosevelt and the Secretary of State Stettinius were besieged by U.S. press calling for an official reaction to the editorial.

Stettinius himself wrote that, "Unfortunately, other British papers had followed the Economists lead. Even the London Times [had] demanded that America 'put its cards on the table'." His view on the editorial, which he expressed in a memorandum to Roosevelt, was that "the British were undergoing a strain in adjusting to a secondary role after having always accepted a leading one".

Cold fusion
In 1989, The Economist editorialized that the cold fusion "affair" was "exactly what science should be about." Science journalist Michael Brooks wrote:

Bosnian WarThe Economist summarily dismissed Brendan Simms' book, Unfinest Hour, on the Bosnian War for having no more than "the force of an inkpot thrown from a schooldesk" and for its criticism of government ministers for their "flaws of logic [and] failures of clairvoyance". Simms himself observed in response that The Economist own attempts at clairvoyance had "backfired spectacularly". He pointed to the weekly's editorials through July 1991 and 1992, which predicted that European Community foreign policy would deal with the situation well and that there would not be all-out war in Bosnia.

Simms characterizes The Economist as being "a longstanding opponent of military intervention" in Bosnia, pointing to its editorials of July 1995, when the 1995 NATO bombing campaign in Bosnia and Herzegovina was underway, and to Bill Emmott's own letter to the publication, which rejected "intervention in this three-cornered civil war, a war which all along has risked escalation into a far wider conflict with even ghastlier consequences", as evidence of this.

Simms observed that the newspaper's editorial stance changed at the end of September 1995, describing it as "finally conced[ing] what it had denied for so long".

Drug liberalizationThe Economist has, since 1989, argued for the legalisation of drugs, calling it the "least bad solution" in a 2009 issue. A February 2016 article praised the undergoing process of legalisation of cannabis in several countries worldwide.

Global warmingThe Economist supports government action on global warming. In 1987 the paper called for a price on carbon emissions. In 1997 it wrote that the United States showed 'dangerous signs' of using the developing world as an excuse to do nothing about global warming. In 1998, The Economist expressed its view that global warming may be a catastrophe that warrants much spending to reduce fossil fuels, but before this, climatologists need a stream of reliable data. In a December editorial before the 2009 United Nations Climate Change Conference, The Economist declared its view that the risk of catastrophic climate change and its effect on the economy outweighs the economic consequences of insuring against global warming now.

War in AfghanistanThe Economist supports the ISAF/NATO operation in Afghanistan, and called on Barack Obama to fight the war "with conviction". It supported his escalation of the American presence there in late 2009, on the basis of security interests and that a withdrawal "would amount to a terrible betrayal of the Afghan people, some of whose troubles are the result of Western intervention".

Invasion of IraqThe Economist supported the 2003 invasion of Iraq, even as early as August 2002, when it argued that "the danger Mr. [Saddam] Hussein poses cannot be overstated". It presented to readers a choice for the West between two options: "to give up and give in, or to remove Mr. Hussein before he gets his bomb. Painful as it is, our vote is for war."

The paper maintained its original support for invasion throughout 2003, but expressed unhappiness as to how it was unfolding, in particular the failure to find any stockpiles or other evidence of weapons of mass destruction. It chastised the Bush administration in July 2003 for its "incomprehensible" defence of its post-war planning. In 2007 the paper disavowed its original judgment in support of the invasion, describing the war a "debacle" that "has inflicted fear, misery and death on its intended beneficiaries".

The episode is remembered by the newspaper’s readers, critics and journalists alike. In 2017 The Economist wrote: "A newspaper cannot publish for 174 years without some mistakes. This one has made its share. We thought Britain was safe in the European exchange-rate mechanism just weeks before it crashed out; we opined, in 1997, that Indonesia was well placed to avoid financial crisis; we noted in 1999 that oil, at $10 per barrel, might well reach $5, almost perfectly timing the bottom of the market; and in 2003 we supported the invasion of Iraq."

Endorsements
Like many newspapers, The Economist uses its pages to endorse candidates and parties ahead of major elections.

British general electionsThe Economist has endorsed a party at British general election since 1955, having remained neutral before that, on the grounds that "A journal that is jealous of its reputation for independence would, in any event, be foolish to compromise it by openly taking sides in a general election."

United States presidential elections

Other national elections

Local elections
 2001 New York City mayoral election: Michael Bloomberg, Republican, "The Economist would shudder and pull the lever for Mr. Bloomberg"
 2003 California recall: Arnold Schwarzenegger, Republican, though the newspaper was strongly opposed to the recall itself
 2004 London mayoral election: Ken Livingstone, Labour, "Why Londoners should vote for Ken Livingstone, despite his many flaws"
 2012 London mayoral election: Boris Johnson, Conservative, "Boris Johnson deserves another term as mayor of London. He also deserves a proper job"

Party primaries
 2008 Kadima leadership election: Tzipi Livni, "Ms Livni has the toughness and the vision to [achieve the co-operation of both a new American president and a host of difficult Arabs]. She is thus Israel's best chance of peace"
 Labour leadership election, 2015: Liz Kendall
 2015 Liberal Democrats leadership election: Norman Lamb, "Of the two candidates, the drier Mr Lamb looks the more likely to raise from the ruins of the Lib Dems' defeat a distinctive force capable of pulling British politics in a liberal direction. He is the sober choice for a punch-drunk party"
 Republican Party presidential primaries, 2016: John Kasich, "If The Economist had cast a vote in the Republican primaries in Iowa, New Hampshire, South Carolina or Nevada we would have supported John Kasich. The governor of Ohio has a good mixture of experience, in Congress and in his home state as well as in the private sector. He has also shown bravery, expanding Medicaid in Ohio though he knew it would count against him later with primary voters, as indeed it has"
Democratic Party presidential primaries, 2020: Joe Biden, "Many younger Democrats think that the former vice-president’s faith in his power to persuade Republicans to cross the aisle and support him is touching at best, and dangerously naive at worst. Yet the only way to bring about long-lasting change in Washington is for a president to find a coalition in Congress that is broad enough to pass laws. After Super Tuesday, it looks as if only one candidate on the Democratic side may be capable of doing that"

Referendums
 2014 Scottish independence referendum: opposed to independence.
 2016 United Kingdom European Union membership referendum: supported remaining in the European Union.
 2016 Italian constitutional referendum: opposed the proposed new constitutional law.
 2017 Turkish constitutional referendum: opposed the proposed new constitutional law.
 2020 Chilean national plebiscite: supported a new constitution.
 2022 Chilean national plebiscite: opposed the proposed new Constitution, calling it a "fiscally irresponsible left-wing wish list".

Some of these might not be considered official endorsements but express The Economist's view on the matter.

Footnotes
  In its 20 May 1950 edition, the newspaper remarked that the Schuman Plan would "stand or fall" depending from its effects on the links between Europe and the U.S., and warned that Konrad Adenauer and others were aiming to organize Western Europe on neutralist lines that would not ally it with the U.S. against the Soviet Union.
  It was re-printed in the 8 January 1945 issue of The Daily Telegraph''.

References

The Economist